Mamadou Keita (born 1 February 1993) is a Malian basketball player who plays for Stade Malien of the Ligue 1 and plays for the Mali national basketball team.

Professional career
Keita started his career with USFAS Bamako and was the MVP of the Malian Ligue 1 in the 2017–18 season.

In the 2018–19 season, Keita played in Algeria with OS Bordj Bou Arréridj.

In 2019, Keita joined the AS Police and helped them qualify for the inaugural season of the Basketball Africa League (BAL). He was also on the Police roster for the 2021 BAL season and average 14.3 points in three group stage games.

In October 2021, Keita was on the roster of Guinean champions SLAC to play in the 2022 BAL Qualifying Tournaments.

In 2022, he joined Stade Malien.

National team career
Keita has been a member of the Mali national basketball team. He played at 2017 AfroBasket, 2019 FIBA AfroCan and 2021 AfroBasket.

BAL career statistics

|-
| style="text-align:left;"|2021
| style="text-align:left;"|AS Police
| 3 || 3 || 27.7 || .410 || .400 || 1.000 || 3.0 || 1.3 || 1.7 || .0 || 14.3
|-
|- class="sortbottom"
| style="text-align:center;" colspan="2"|Career
| 3 || 3 || 27.7 || .410 || .400 || 1.000 || 3.0 || 1.3 || 1.7 || .0 || 14.3

Honours
AS Police
Ligue 1: 2019, 2020
Malian Cup: 2020
Stade Malien

 Ligue 1: 2022
Individual
Ligue 1 Most Valuable Player: 2017

References

External links
 Mamadou Keita at RealGM
 

1993 births
Living people
Malian men's basketball players
Shooting guards
AS Police basketball players
USFAS Bamako basketball players
SLAC basketball players
Sportspeople from Bamako
21st-century Malian people
Stade Malien basketball players